Witchcraft Destroys Minds & Reaps Souls (also known as simply Witchcraft) is the debut studio album by the American rock band Coven. Released in 1969, it was unusual in that it dealt with overtly occult and satanic themes. It was removed from the market soon after its release due to controversy, as it coincided with the hysteria surrounding the Manson family and rampant media speculation about occult influences on the American counterculture. The album's lyrical themes and visual design were influential on the occult rock and heavy metal genres.

Background
One of the songwriters, James Vincent, appears with the name "Jim Donlinger" on the album. Born James Vincent Dondelinger, he was not a member of the band (prior to this he was in the band Aorta), but was asked by Bill Traut, Coven's producer (and founder of Dunwich Records, whose logo also appears on the album), to write, arrange and co-produce the album together with Traut. Vincent describes the event in negative terms, as a "bizarre album project":

 "Bill brought me a large box full of books about witchcraft and related subjects. He told me to read them and start writing some songs ... Sometime before the sun came up, I had completely written all the material requested of me for the entire album ... Coven also contributed four songs to the project."

Reception and influence
Despite its brief initial release, it remains a classic of its genre, and in some ways set groundbreaking trends for later rock bands. This album marked the first appearance in music of the sign of the horns, inverted crosses, and the phrase "Hail Satan". Today, these are characteristics of the heavy metal genres. According to rock journalist Lester Bangs, "in England lie unskilled laborers like Black Sabbath, which was hyped as a rockin' ritual celebration of the Satanic mass, something like England's answer to Coven". As a further coincidence, Coven's bass guitarist and co-writer (Michael Gregory Osborne) is credited as "Oz Osborne", and the opening track is "Black Sabbath".

Kurt Cobain and Nirvana spoke of this album in an interview in 1990, stating it is one of the records they would listen to while driving to the next show on tour.

Track listing

Personnel
Jinx Dawson – lead vocals
Jim Donlinger – guitar, vocals
Jim Nyeholt – organ, piano, keyboards
Alan Estes, Oz Osborne – bass
Steve Ross – drums, percussion

Production
Produced by Bill Traut
Engineered by Mal Davis

References

External links 
 Coven Myspace page
 Inside of album cover (large graphic)

1969 debut albums
Coven (band) albums
Mercury Records albums
Obscenity controversies in music